Anion exchange transporter is a protein that in humans is encoded by the SLC26A7 gene.

Function 

This gene is one member of a family of sulfate/anion transporter genes. Family members are well conserved in their genomic (number and size of exons) and protein (aa length among species) structures yet have markedly different tissue expression patterns. This gene has abundant and specific expression in the kidney. Splice variants that use both alternate transcription initiation and polyadenylation sites have been described for this gene.

See also 
 Solute carrier family

References

Further reading 

 
 
 
 
 

Solute carrier family